Kotalpokhar (also written as Kotalpukur, Kotal Pukur) is a village in the Barharwa CD block in the Rajmahal subdivision of the Sahibganj district in the Indian state of Jharkhand.

Geography

Location

Overview
Rajmahal coalfield is shown in the map. The entire area is overwhelmingly rural with only small pockets of urbanisation.

Note: The full screen map is interesting. All places marked on the map are linked and you can easily move on to another page of your choice. Enlarge the map to see what else is there – one gets railway links, many more road links and so on.

Demographics
According to the 2011 Census of India, Kotal Pukur a total population of 2,818, of which 1,452 (52%) were males and 1,366 (48%) were females. Population in the age range 0–6 years was 580. The total number of literate persons in Kotal Pukur was 1,294 (57.82% of the population over 6 years).

Civic administration

Police station
Kotalpokhar police station serves the Barharwa CD block.

Transport
Kotalpokhar railway station is on the Sahibganj loop.

Education
Kotalpokhar High School is a Hindi-medium coeducational institution established in 1956. It has facilities for teaching in classes IX and X.

References

Villages in Sahibganj district